Peters, Florida was a community in southern Dade County during the first half of the 20th century. It was located at the intersection of Quail Roost Road and the Florida East Coast Railway, and later became part of Perrine.

References

Unincorporated communities in Miami-Dade County, Florida
Unincorporated communities in Florida